The 2020 FAI Cup Final, known as the 2020 Extra.ie FAI Cup Final for sponsorship reasons, was the final match of the 2020 FAI Cup, the national association football cup of the Republic of Ireland. The match took place on Sunday 6 December 2020 at the Aviva Stadium in Dublin, and was contested by defending champions Shamrock Rovers and Dundalk.
The match was a repeat of the 2019 Final.

The match was broadcast live on RTÉ Two and RTÉ Two HD in the Republic of Ireland, and via the RTÉ Player worldwide with commentary from George Hamilton and Pat Fenlon.

Dundalk won the game 4-2 after extra-time with a hat-trick from David McMillan.

Match summary

References

External links
Official Site

Final
FAI Cup finals
Fai Cup Final 2020
Fai Cup Final 2020